The members of the 25th Manitoba Legislature were elected in the Manitoba general election held in June 1958. The legislature sat from October 23, 1958, to March 31, 1959.

The Progressive Conservative Party led by Duff Roblin formed a minority government.

Douglas Lloyd Campbell of the Liberal-Progressive Party was Leader of the Opposition.

Abram Harrison served as speaker for the assembly.

In March 1959, Roblin decided to consider a defeat on a procedural motion as a vote of no confidence and called for a new election.

There were two sessions of the 25th Legislature:

John Stewart McDiarmid was Lieutenant Governor of Manitoba.

Members of the Assembly 
The following members were elected to the assembly in 1958:

Notes:

By-elections 
None.

References 

Terms of the Manitoba Legislature
1958 establishments in Manitoba
1959 disestablishments in Manitoba